General elections were held in Tanzania on 26 October 1975. The country was a one-party state at the time, with the Tanganyika African National Union as the sole legal party on the mainland, and the Afro-Shirazi Party was the only party in Zanzibar. For the National Assembly election there were two candidates from the same party in each of the constituencies (although 40 were elected unopposed), whilst the presidential election was effectively a referendum on TANU leader Julius Nyerere's candidacy.

Voter turnout was 81.7% for both elections. The country's population was around 15 million at the time of the election.

Results

President

National Assembly

References

Presidential elections in Tanzania
1975 in Tanzania
Elections in Tanzania
One-party elections
Tanzania
October 1975 events in Africa